Figure skating at the 2015 Winter Universiade was held at the Universiade Igloo in Granada from February 4 to 8, 2015.

Medalists

Medal table

References

External links
 Figure skating results at the 2015 Winter Universiade.
Results book

 
Figure skating
2015
2015 Winter Universiade
Winter Universiade
International winter sports competitions hosted in Spain